Trippin' is a 1999 American comedy film directed by David Raynr and starring Deon Richmond, Maia Campbell, Donald Faison, and Guy Torry. The film provided one of Anthony Anderson's earliest film roles.

Plot
Greg (Deon Richmond) is nearing the end of his high school days as graduation slowly approaches. He is also anxiously awaiting prom and has the hopes of going with Cinny (Maia Campbell), the school's local beauty. As he tries to ask his parents for help paying for prom, they begin nagging him after finding out he hasn’t filled out one college application, telling him they won’t give a dime until he fills one out.

Production notes
''Trippin was filmed on location in California in the cities of Los Angeles and Long Beach in 1998. Narbonne High School in Harbor City was used for most of the film's school shots. The working title of the film while it was in production was G's Trippin, but this was later shortened to its before release.

Reception
Trippin''' was poorly received by critics. 

The film made $2,527,909 its opening weekend and grossed a total of $9,017,070 during its theatrical run.

ReleaseTrippin was released during the start of the summer movie season of 1999.  It was released in a limited number of theaters compared to the summer blockbusters released around the same time.  The film did well enough to crack the top ten in gross receipts during its first few weeks of release.

References

External links 
 
 
 
 

1999 films
1990s teen comedy films
African-American comedy films
American coming-of-age films
Films shot in Los Angeles
American independent films
American teen comedy films
Films produced by Marc Abraham
Films scored by Michel Colombier
Beacon Pictures films
1999 comedy films
1999 directorial debut films
Films directed by David Raynr
1990s English-language films
1990s American films